The 1995 African U-17 Championship qualification was a men's under-17 football competition which decided the participating teams of the 1995 African U-17 Championship.

Qualification

First round
The winners advanced to the Second Round.

|}

Second round
The winners advanced to the Finals.

|}

Qualified teams

 (host nation)

Notes and references

External links
 African U-17 Championship 1995 - rsssf.org

Under-17 Championship Qualification, 1995
1995